Corsewall Point, or Corsill Point, is a headland on the northwest coast of Wigtonshire, Kirkcolm near Stranraer, Dumfries and Galloway, Scotland. A lighthouse, Corsewall Lighthouse was placed here in 1816, for the directing of vessels from the Scottish side into the Irish Channel. William Smith, a 19th-century British Classicist identifies the point with the Novantarum Promontorium mentioned by Ptolemy in his Geography as the most northerly point of the peninsula of the Novantae in Britannia Barbara.

References

Headlands of Scotland
Wigtownshire
Rhins of Galloway